is a 2002 Japanese anime television series produced by NAS and TV Tokyo and animated by Studio Deen. It has also spawned two manga series and three video games, one of which was also localized and given an English dub. It is based on the popular Bomberman video game series created by Hudson Soft.

Plot
The Jetters are a highly trained intergalactic police force for keeping unique items safe from the Hige-Hige bandits. Mighty, an expert Bomberman and the leader of the Jetters, disappears while on a mission. Dr. Ein accepts Mighty's younger brother, White Bomber, into the Jetters because they need a Bomberman for the team. White Bomber is clumsy and childish, but idolizes his older brother. White Bomber and the rest of the Jetters have many adventures, foiling Doctor Mechado and Mujoe's plans to steal one-of-a-kind objects, facing off against the Hige-Hige Bandits, and returning antiques to their rightful owners.

Early episodes of Bomberman Jetters started out with the "monster of the week" formula, where Dr. Mechado and Mujoe would send in one of their "Super Combined" Bombermen one at a time to attack the Jetters.

Eventually the format shifted from light-hearted comedy "monster of the week" to a more dramatic, darker action story dealing with the themes of death, betrayal, and revenge, but still retaining some of the lighter aspect. Plots include characters going through trials with character development such as Shout learning the truth about her mother, how Bagular first met Mujoe, and White Bomber dealing with learning the truth of what happened to his older brother Mighty.

Characters

Jetters

A native Bomberman from Planet Bomber, White Bomber is very clumsy and quite thick. He wrecks things by accident, in contrast to his older brother Mighty. His accidents tend to make a critical situation worse, much to Shout's frustration. He brags endlessly about any achievement, no matter how small. White Bomber may mess up sometimes but he always means well and always tries to help. He is 10 years old. White Bomber doesn't seem to get angry at Shout, no matter how many times she yells, curses, and hits him (although this is purely out of fear of inciting Shout's wrath even further, rather than out of affection). He joined the Jetters in episode 2, thanks to Momo's relationship with Dr. Ein.

Shout is the leader of the Jetters, who filled in for Mighty after his disappearance. She is the only female member of the Jetters. Shout picks on White Bomber, but she actually cares for him like a brother. She says that when he gets older he will lead the Jetters, just like Mighty once did. Her mother died in a space flight accident when she was an infant. Her age is unknown but she appears to be about the same age as White Bomber. In her civilian mode, she runs a ramen restaurant.

A robot created by Dr. Ein. He is a unique robot that wields gizmos in his body to assist the Jetters. He hates it when Bongo modifies him, especially for cooking. He does not remember when he was created or who created him, and has a recurring dream about fighting and defeating a giant robot.

A hairy, large-bodied inventor from Planet Dodonpa who helps Dr. Ein and enjoys modifying Gangu, mostly without Gangu's permission. Like most of his species, he enjoys curry and ends his sentences with "bongo." Though he doesn't look like it, he is actually a royal prince. His full name is Sarusamanbo Kongaragaccha Bosanovavitch Bongoro Dodonpa XXXIV.

An anthropomorphic bird and a personal friend of Mighty. Birdy is a competent fighter and rarely reveals his emotions, but he loses his temper easily, especially when Rui is around and White Bomber is not. As a side job, he works as a taxi driver. In episode 36 he seems to know Mama. He is mysterious and goes out by himself a lot, but none of the other Jetters knows what he does or where he goes. Birdy can fight well and can make wings come out of his back to fly, and he can throw sharp feathers.

White Bomber's older brother, known as the legendary Bomberman, who bears a striking resemblance to the original Bomberman. Mighty has a silver visor covering his right eye and wears a red cape. He has a cool and collected personality and a strong sense of justice. Mighty and White Bomber share a very close brother bond. Mighty has some of the personality traits of White Bomber. He rides a hover-bike called the Moto-Jetter. Mighty can create the Thunder Bomb. After his brief return to Planet Bomber in episode 1 to guard Cosmo Diamond, he went on another mission to planet Nonbiri. Mighty fought the Higehige forces on his own, but after the last base had been destroyed, Mighty disappeared. In Zero's flashback, it was shown that Mighty was damaged in a gun attack by Mujoe and Zero had penetrated his wound to obtain combat data. Mighty destroyed the final base with his own attack. Mighty tried to give White Bomber his seventh Bomb Star before destroying the base, but he only possessed six Bomb Stars. The seventh Bomb Star is Mighty's badge.

A scientist who founded the Jetters. He has an annoying tendency to blow his nose on any piece of paper nearby, including letters of resignation, leading, understandably, to much confusion. He has a crush on Grandma Bomber (White Bomber and Mighty's grandmother), and calls her "Momo-chan", which makes her angry. Often regarded as a joke character, he also has a serious side. Ein tells the Jetters when there are missions.

Hige-Hige

Bagular is the mastermind behind the Hige-Hige Gang, with the goal of collecting universally unique items. He resembles a large blue beardly old Bomberman with a letter B on his forehead and wears one gold monocle over his left eye and has a belt, gloves and a red cape. He is not actually evil, and was great friends with the Jetters' founder, Dr. Ein, but they were split by an intense rivalry for the affections of Momo. In later episodes, it is revealed that Bagular is a pawn in Dr Mechado's sinister scheme to take over the Hige Hige Bandits. Bagular was later rescued by Mujoe in his second Schnurburt base infiltration attempt.

A pawn of Bagular, Mujoe is usually in charge of commanding the Hige-Hige Gang's troops. He resembles a pro wrestler. He has blonde hair, a blonde mustache and beard, and a strange-looking spandex suit. He wears shades and a large green cape. Mujoe used the Super Combined Bomberman Making Machine and shot at Charaboms to make Mermaid Bomber, Thunder Bomber, Fire Bomber, and Grand Bomber. Bagular found the jobless Mojoe sleeping in the streets, and decided to employ Mojoe on his quest against Dr. Ein. After the Schnurburt base had been taken over by Dr. Mechado, Jetters attempted to free Bagular by infiltrating the Schnurburt base, but the plot failed. Mujoe then attempted to sacrifice himself to take down Max, but failed. Mujoe escaped from Max's attack by pulling an escape trigger just before the attack hits. Since then, he re-infiltrated Schnurburt base under Dr. Ein's secret plan in episode 49, and was successful.
 / Dr. Mechard

Mechado is the Hige-Hige Bandits' mad scientist and Bagular's more trusted henchman. He does all the building and machinery for Bagular and the Hige-Hige Bandits. In Episode 40, Mechado turns against Bagular. Mechado and Bagular went to the same science academy back in their younger days, and Mechado blames Bagular for stealing his ideas about the bomb crystals. Bagular tries to explain that his idea was false, but Mechado refused to listen. As a result, Mechado goes into a rage, locking Bagular up in prison and taking over the Hige-Hige Bandits. Since the bomb crystals are inside Planet Bomber, his ultimate plan is to collide Planet Bomber and Planet Jetters together until both planets are destroyed. His main creation is the Super Combined Bomberman Making Machine to turn any inanimate objects or helpless Charaboms into his own Bombermen.
 / (MA-10[X])

At first solely referred to as the infamous "Space Bounty Hunter," it is later discovered that he is a creation of Mechado. He has no feelings or compassion, and will do whatever it takes to reach his goal. He uses the lightning bomb and balloon bomb, similar to the missing Mighty. Max's body was destroyed in episode 51, but he manages to write his data into Zero before Zero begins the lethal hit, hence taking control of his body. Max's spirit was destroyed by Shirobon's ruse bomb, saving the fatally wounded Zero. There are five other units based on this unit.

Hige-Hige Bandits are small, powerful robots. The basic members of the Hige-Hige gang equal of strength to the Bombermen. Created by Bagular, they are very powerful as individuals and even more powerful in numbers. The Hige-Hige seem to be always happy in every piece of work they are doing but still expect to be paid for it. To those outside the Hige-Hige Bandits, excluding Mujoe, it appears all they can say is "Hige", but it is apparently a language in and of itself. There are three types of Hige-Hige bandits. Their uniform consists of an orange scarf, white boots and gloves, and black full body armor. The programming of Hige-Hige units are stored inside disks that are loaded into the disk drives in their heads.

An alien-like bartender working in the Hige-Hige headquarters who debuted in episode 5. Mujoe shows great affection for Mama. She is also well liked by the Hige-Hige. In episode 40 she is held at the base, but still works as a bartender. Later she was rescued by Mujoe.

Combination bombers

A bomber created in episode 3 when the combined bomber machine was tested on a bat. Has bat wings and a pig nose. His special bomb is the bat bomb, which flies around before releasing a swarm of bats. He reappeared to compete in the B-1 Grand Prix, but was defeated by Pretty Bomber in 1st round.

A seagull bomber that appeared in episode 9 in search of a unique item. Under the orders of Mujoe, it attacks by firing missiles, but was destroyed by Max's lightning bomb. It reappeared to compete in the B-1 Grand Prix and was able to win first round. It lost in the second round when the referee declared it was absent, even though it was on the battlefield.

A female bomber created in episode 4, capable of making ultrasound bombs and toss back bombs thrown by opponents. She has an uncontrollable urge to jump through hoops. She wears a swim ring with a skirt underneath, a seashell bra, and lipstick. She was destroyed by Shirobon's bomb when Dolphin Bomber tries to jump through a hoop created by modifying Gangu; she was turned back into a normal dolphin. She reappeared to compete in the B-1 Grand Prix, but lost in the first round when the pool where Dolphin Bomber is in dried up.

A bomber created in episode 8 in the ice comet. He does not throw bombs, but attacks with his claws. After it was tossed in the air by Bongo with a bear trap made from Gangu, it was destroyed by Shirobon's bomb. He reappeared to compete in the B-1 Grand Prix, but was defeated by Bomber Kid.

A spinning top bomber created in episode 5 to help Mujoe to dig tunnels, but it is incapable of digging tunnels. It can create spinning top bombs, but it prefers to play tricks with the bombs than to use them as weapons. It was destroyed by Shirobon's bomb after Shout trapped it in elevator. It reappeared to compete in the B-1 Grand Prix, but when it fought against Hige-hige unit #156 in the first round, it lost.

It was created by combining Mechado with the four Proto-Max units in episode 50. Although his name is "Dark Force Bomber", he looks angelic in appearance. His attack is the Dark Force Bomb. Dark Force Bomber was defeated by Shirobon's newest attack in episode 51, and was returned into the four Proto-Max units and Mechado. In the videogame, he was created by the combined powers of the Bomber Shitennou, and he had more attacks.

Bomber Shitennou

A flame-wielding Bomber who was the first Bomber Shitennou seen in action; Flame Bomber defeated White Bomber. He is very childish and doesn't take his work very seriously. He was overpowered and defeated by White Bomber's new flame-based bomb star. After he was defeated in episode 16, he returned into three Pteragodon. As well as possessing Pyrokinesis, he can produce and wield his signature "Flame Fire" Bombs. His Battlefield is an ancient Chinese temple courtyard.

A female water-wielding Bomber who took over the job of the beaten Flame Bomber in episode 17. During her encounter with the Jetters, she fell in love with Birdy, but her plans were foiled by Shirobon. She is proud and arrogant, and tends to act more like a spoiled little girl, using her looks on Mujoe to get what she wants. She likes to do things her way, or not at all. When Mermaid Bomber was defeated after being electrocuted by Shirobon's Sunrise Thunder Bomb in episode 18, she turned into three Triple Shells. She can produce and use her signature "Splash Water" Bombs. Her Battlefield is a large floating oasis.

A strong and kind Bomber Shitennou. He is a very honourable person, and sometimes not sure whether he is fighting for good or evil. He befriends Shirobon, not knowing he is a Jetter. When faced with destroying Shirobon, he cannot bring himself to do it, and convinces White Bomber to destroy him instead. As well as being able to roll at high speeds and fire off the spikes on his body to attack foes, he can produce and wield the Clay Bombs and Brick Bombs. His Battlefield is a farm, but in the video game it was an underground arena with a design similar to the traditional Bomberman maze.

The last and most powerful of the Bomber Shitennou. Aside from being able to use his signature "Thunder Bombs" and "Flash Thunderbolt Bombs", he has mastery over a wide variety of electrical attacks. Incredibly loyal to Mujoe, he respects his elders and superiors; he wants to expose those who are framing Mujoe at all costs. Because of this, he has an intense rivalry with Max, as he believes that he is plotting to overthrow Mujoe. He is defeated by Max's signature attack, Hyper Plasma Bomb. His battlefield is never seen in the anime (Mechado interrupted him when he was about to summon it), but in the video game, his battlefield is a floating arena surrounded by an electric fence.

Other Bombermen

First runner-up in the B-1 Grand Prix at least twice, losing to Mighty and then Zero. Momo's former student. Uses the "Bancho bomb", "banchou" referring to the leader of a student gangster group. He obtains his sixth Bomb Star after completing a Bomb Star search quest with White Bomber, Kobon, and Daibon.

White Bomber's friend and Oyabon's follower. He cannot use bombs because he is not really a Bomberman. Constantly praises Oyabon after he speaks, stating that he "will take this lesson to heart". The name "Kobon" is a pun on the word "kobun", meaning "underling". He eventually obtains a Bomb Star after completing a Bomb Star search quest with White Bomber, Oyabon, and Daibon.

A cowardly Bomberman who always regards himself as worthless. Followed by a being much like Louie named . Eventually, he obtains his second Bomb Star after completing a Bomb Star search quest with White Bomber, Kobon, and Oyabon.
 / 

A very swift and powerful female Bomber who lived with her grandsons, White Bomber and Mighty. She taught them most of what they knew as bombers, and constantly tries to help White Bomber improve his skills.

A senior B-1 Grand Prix competitor against White Bomber in the second round, who was defeated by him using Silver Bomber's own technique.

Bombermen from older video games

A pink female bomber who has a large fan base. Uses the "Pretty Bomb." Pretty Bomber won the first round in the B-1 Grand Prix, but was absent in the second round.

A cowboy bomber who can fire bombs at the speed of a bullet. He later helps White Bomber against Dark Force Bomber.

A ninja bomber who specializes in confusing the enemy with clouds of smoke. Uses the "Shuriken bomb". During the B-1 Grand Prix, against Shirobon in first round, it was defeated by Shirobon's fire bomb. He later helps Shirobon against Dark Force Bomber.

Charabom

 / Kaiman

 / Pommy

 / Pomyu Dragon

A red, fire breathing Charabom living in the ice comet; appeared in episode 8.

A pink Elephan Charabom debuted in episode 11. The charabom first appeared from an escape pod that crash-landed into the Jetters base on Planet Jetters. The Hiroshi name was given by Bomberman. After it had been returned to its mother in episode 12, the Jetters learnt Hiroshi was a female charabom named Catherine.

Other characters

Rui is a green kangaroo-like animal who helps Bomberman by letting him ride on his back. His species is one generally chosen by Bombermen as a sidekick. Rui often washes dishes at the Jetters ramen shop. Rui is a good ramen cook, and is very devoted to whatever he does. All he can say is his name. Gangu and White Bomber are the only ones who can fully understand him; Birdy buys a book on Louie language in an attempt to understand him.

Misty is an anthropomorphic cat with a short temper like Shout. Before her encounter with White Bomber, she met Mighty and Birdy in a ruby heist. After being saved by White Bomber, she gave him a red bombstar. She is a space thief, but she fell in love with Mighty, and later took in Zero after finding him while at the site of Mighty's death. She realized Zero's true identity soon after meeting him, and constantly gets him to reveal knowledge only Mighty should have known. Originally Mighty wanted to invite Misty to join Jetters, but the Jetters badge was broken.

Shout's father, a widower and the owner of the noodle store. He is usually seen reading a newspaper, which covers his face. He lost his wife, in the explosion of 1988A supernova in a space flight accident.

A large duck-like character who is an expert at gathering information. Usually seen wearing a trenchcoat and sunglasses. His main client is Birdy.

Media
A manga series was created by Tomofumi Matsubara, which was published by Shogakukan and began serialization by CoroCoro Comic in May 2002. Another manga series, titled , was created by Takeshi Tamai and it was published and serialized by the same company and magazine. It began serialization in September 2002, and both manga series' ended in March 2003.

A 52-episode anime series was produced by Nihon Ad Systems (NAS) and TV Tokyo, animated by Studio Deen, and broadcast on TV Tokyo from October 2, 2002, to September 24, 2003. The anime was intended to be localized for other countries, but these plans were quietly cancelled for unknown reasons.

A video game, titled  was created by Hudson Soft and released on October 24, 2002, for the Game Boy Advance.

Another video game, simply titled Bomberman Jetters, was created by Hudson Soft and released for the PlayStation 2 and GameCube in Japan on December 19, 2002. Majesco Entertainment released the GameCube version in North America on March 10, 2004.

A third video game, titled  was created by the same company for the same platform, but was released on October 16, 2003.

A Mobile game, titled Bomberman Jetters Mobile was created for same platform and was released on April 10, 2003.

Theme songs
Openings

October 2, 2002 – July 9, 2003
Lyricist: Hideo Suwa / Composer: Tatsuya Furukawa / Arranger: Tatsuya Furukawa / Singers: Hideo Suwa
Episode Range: 1-41

July 16, 2003 – September 24, 2003
Lyricist: Hideo Suwa / Composer: Tatsuya Furukawa / Arranger: Masahiro Iuchi / Singers: Hideo Suwa
Episode Range: 42-52

Endings

October 2, 2002 – June 4, 2003
Lyricist: Asuka Matsumoto / Composer: Maruyama Kazunori / Arranger: Tatsuya Furukawa / Singers: Asuka Matsumoto
Episode Range: 1-36
"love letter"
June 11, 2003 – September 17, 2003
Lyricist: Manami Fujino / Composer: Tsugumi Kataoka / Arranger: Tsugumi Kataoka / Singers: PARQUETS
Episode Range: 37-51

September 24, 2003
Lyricist: Hideo Suwa / Composer: Tatsuya Furukawa / Arranger: Tatsuya Furukawa / Singers: Hideo Suwa
Episode Range: 52

Episodes

References

External links
NAS webpage

Official TV Tokyo webpage
Official Studio Deen webpage

2002 manga
2002 anime television series debuts
2002 Japanese television series debuts
2002 video games
2003 Japanese television series endings
2003 video games
Japanese children's animated adventure television series
Japanese children's animated comic science fiction television series
Adventure anime and manga
Bomberman anime and manga
Comedy anime and manga
Hudson Soft games
Konami franchises
Multiplayer and single-player video games
Science fiction anime and manga
Shogakukan franchises
Shōnen manga
Studio Deen
TV Tokyo original programming
Game Boy Advance games
Game Boy Advance-only games
GameCube games
PlayStation 2 games
Video games based on anime and manga
Video games based on television series
Video games developed in Japan
Video games with cel-shaded animation